Charles Pugh may refer to:

 Charles Pugh (1971– ), an American television journalist, radio personality, and politician
 Charles C. Pugh (1940– ), an American mathematician
 Charles Henry Pugh (1840–1901), founder of a British bicycle manufacturer
 Charlie Pugh (1896–1951), a Welsh international rugby union player

See also 
Pugh is a surname